WISE J031624.35+430709.1 is a brown dwarf of spectral class T8, located in constellation Perseus at approximately 106 light-years from Earth.  It is one of the furthest T-class brown dwarfs known.

Discovery
WISE J031624.35+430709.1 was discovered in 2012 by Mace et al. from data, collected by Wide-field Infrared Survey Explorer (WISE) Earth-orbiting satellite — NASA infrared-wavelength 40 cm (16 in) space telescope, which mission lasted from December 2009 to February 2011. In March 2013, the discovery paper was published.

Distance
Currently the most accurate distance estimate of WISE J031624.35+430709.1 is a trigonometric parallax, published in 2019 by Kirkpatrick et al.:  pc, or  ly.

References

Brown dwarfs
T-type stars
Perseus (constellation)
WISE objects